Tai Po Tin is a village in Ta Kwu Ling, North District, Hong Kong.

Administration
Tai Po Tin is a recognized village under the New Territories Small House Policy.

History
At the time of the 1911 census, the population of Tai Po Tin was 56. The number of males was 25.

References

External links
 Delineation of area of existing village Tai Po Tin (Ta Kwu Ling) for election of resident representative (2019 to 2022)

Villages in North District, Hong Kong